Soay Mòr is an island in West Loch Tarbert, between the northern and southern parts of Harris. The uninhabited island is separated from the southwest coast of North Harris by the Soay Sound. The adjacent  Soay Beag is accessible on foot at low tide.

Footnotes

Islands off Lewis and Harris
Harris, Outer Hebrides
Uninhabited islands of the Outer Hebrides